Poem Strip is a 1969 comic book by the Italian writer and illustrator Dino Buzzati. It retells the myth of Orpheus and Eurydice, set in Milan in the 1960s. The aesthetics are influenced by 1960s pop culture. An English translation by Marina Harss was published in 2009.

Reception
Richard Rayner of Los Angeles Times wrote in 2009: "The images are surreal, sexy and frightening, and the text (translated here for the first time into English by Marina Harss, with lettering by Rich Tommaso) is both compelling and poetic. There are shades of Fellini, shades of Dickens, shades of the great Italian horror director Mario Bava. A beautiful book." Publishers Weekly wrote: "The text might have lost some of its lyricism in the translation from the Italian, as it occasionally seems stiff. The artwork retains its bold, sensual power, however."

References

External links
 Publicity page at the Italian publisher's website 
 Publicity page at the American publisher's website

1969 comics debuts
Classical mythology in comics
Italian comics titles
Italian comic strips
Milan in fiction
Orpheus
Works by Dino Buzzati
Arnoldo Mondadori Editore books